Obliterate is a grindcore band from Košice. Founded in 1992, it became one of the first bands of this genre in Slovakia.

Discography
1993 Pieces of Superior Life (demo)
1995 Blindness (demo)
1997 Blindness (split 7-inch EP w/ Excrete Alive) Merciless Core
1999 [promo tape]
2000 [split MC w/ N.C.C.] Impregnate Productions
2000 The Feelings Erebos Productions
2002 Against Your Will - split with DIN ADDICT  / Undislessed * Skud Records
2003 Tangled Ways / extremist records
2005 The Ball Season / vinyl split with MASO / KAZ Re-Chords / Production X
2007 We Haven't Given Up Yet / self-released
2009 Something Wrong  / noisehead records
2012 Superboring / gothoom prod.

Line-up
Gabriel Kunay - vocals
Ivan "Ivin" Babilonsky - guitar
Marcel "Barbie" Malega - drums
Janči "Stu" Ragančík - bass

Musical groups established in 1992
Slovak heavy metal musical groups
Grindcore musical groups